The second season of The Challenge: All Stars premiered on Paramount+ on November 11, 2021. The season features twenty-four past cast members from the flagship series competing for $500,000.

Contestants

Format
All-Stars 2 features a daily challenge, nomination process and an elimination round.

Daily Challenge: Players compete in a main challenge either individually, in pairs or in teams. For team challenges, each team must select one male and one female representative before the challenge begins. The winning male and female (for individual challenges), winning pair (for pair challenges) or winning representatives (for team challenges) are immune from elimination and earn power for the round while respective losing players of each gender, losing pair or losing representatives of the last-place team are automatically sent into the Arena. 
Nominations: The daily challenge winners nominate two men and two women to potentially go into the elimination round. Players – excluding the daily challenge winners, daily challenge losers, four nominees and Life Shield holders if they used the Life Shield – must then publicly vote for one male and female to compete in the elimination round. The male and female who receive the most votes will participate in the elimination round.
 Eliminations (The Arena): The losers of the daily challenge compete in an individual elimination round against the nominated player of the same gender. The loser is eliminated while the winner remains in the game and earns the Life Shield for the next round of play.

In the sixth episode, players were required to form male-female teams of two to compete in the "Deep Dive" challenge. After the challenge, it was revealed that players would compete in these teams for the remainder of the season. The winning team of the daily challenge is immune while the losing team is automatically sent into the Arena. The winners must nominate two teams where at nominations, eligible players would vote for one of these teams to compete in the Arena against the last-place team.

Twists
Life Shield: The winning players or team of an elimination round are awarded the "Life Shield" for the next cycle of the game. They may use the Life Shield to save themselves if they place last in the subsequent challenge, or save one of the nominees selected by the daily challenge winners. Players or teams are ineligible to vote for the respective cycle of the game if they elect to use the Life Shield.
 If players use the Life Shield to save themselves as the losing representative in a team challenge, they must select a replacement player to compete in the Arena in their place. If teams use the Life Shield to save themselves after placing last in a challenge, the second-last team is sent to the Arena in their place.
 If players use the Life Shield to save a nominee or nominated team, the winners of the daily challenge must select a replacement nominee in their place.

Gameplay

Challenge games
Boarding Party: Played in male/female pairs, teams must jump from a Zodiac boat onto a speeding motorboat, collect two colored skulls and cross a beam onto a second motorboat. They must then jump off the second boat and dunk the skulls into a basket while mid-air. The team with the fastest time wins while the team with the slowest time is automatically sent to the Arena. 
Winners: Derrick K. & Jodi
Around the Block: Played in two teams of eleven, two team members at a time race down a trail and collect one of their team’s geometric puzzle pieces before the next two team members go. Once teams collect the eleven puzzle pieces, they must use them to solve their first puzzle at the bottom of a pyramid. After solving the first puzzle, teams follow the same process to collect another eleven puzzle pieces floating within a cenote before using them to solve their second puzzle on the second level of the pyramid. The first team to solve both puzzles and pull the lever at the top of the pyramid wins.
Winners: Brad, Darrell, Derrick K., Janelle, Jasmine, Katie, Laterrian, Melinda, Nehemiah, Tina & Tyler
Bright Skies: Played in male and female rounds, players begin harnessed on a ledge off the side of a 25-story building. After being asked a question with multiple answers, such as naming a novel in the Harry Potter series, one player at a time must give one of the possible answers. If they answer incorrectly or provide a previously given answer, players are pulled off the ledge and drop ten-stories below. The last player of each gender standing wins while the first player of each gender to answer incorrectly, or refuse to participate, are automatically sent into the Arena.
Winners: Casey & Steve
Bounce Back: Played two players at a time, players bounce across seven trampolines suspended above water, leaping off the final trampoline to collect a hanging puzzle piece. They must then swim to shore with their piece and repeat this process for all three puzzle pieces. After collecting all three pieces, players must use them to solve three math equations using the numbers printed on each piece. The male and female with the fastest time wins while the male and female with the slowest time are automatically sent to the Arena. In the event that multiple players are unable to complete the challenge, the last-place player is determined by the number of jumps they made off the final trampoline.
Winners: Darrell & Jodi
Deep Dive: Teams begin on a 30-foot platform above a cenote. They can either jump directly into the cenote or climb down a ladder to a 15-foot platform and jump from there at the risk of losing time. Once in the cenote, teams must swim to four buoys and dive to collect a bag of puzzle pieces from a chest submerged 15 feet under each buoy. After collecting all four bags of puzzle pieces, teams must return to shore and solve the 3D-puzzle. The team with the fastest time wins while the team with the slowest time is automatically sent into the Arena. 
Winners: Brad & Jodi
Steer Clear: Teams begin on the back of a monster truck, with one team member suspended from a 20-foot mounted crane boom off the side of the truck. As the monster truck speeds down a runway, their partner must steer the boom so they can collect flags attached to several cars and motorcycles along the runway. The team that collects the most flags wins while the team that collects the least flags is automatically sent to the Arena.
Winners: Brad & Jodi
Dive & Conquer: While tethered together, teams run half a mile down a path towards a cenote. They must then jump into the cenote, swim towards the answer key and memorize it before returning down the path to their puzzle station. There, teams must replicate the answer key they memorized by placing tiles on a board, and are free to return to the cenote many or as few times as they wish. The first team to replicate their answer key wins while the last team is automatically sent to the Arena.
Winners: Jonna & MJ
Make the Connection: Teams begin harnessed on top of a speeding semi-truck. Each team member must jump onto one of the two adjacent semi-trucks, each with four small boxes on them. They must untie knots to open each box and collect four keys inside before using the keys to unlock a larger box with their final key. Team members must then climb back onto the first semi-truck and use the key to unlock a final box containing an idol. There is a three-minute time limit before the adjacent trucks speed away and leave teams behind. The team with the fastest time wins while the team with the slowest time is automatically sent to the Arena.
Winners: Melinda & Nehemiah

Arena games
Deadweight: Each player has three 300-pound coffins, each with a chain attached. They must pull each coffin across the Arena until they can secure the chains on a post at the opposite side. For the two of the coffins, they must also solve a problem inside before they can begin pulling. The first player to secure all three chains to their post wins.
Played by: Derek C. vs Nehemiah, Ayanna vs. Leah
Fireball: Similar to tic-tac-toe, players begin with five colored balls set on fire. They must transfer one ball at a time across the Arena and place them slots of a three-by-three board, attempting to line up three of their balls in a row either vertically, horizontally or diagonally to win the round. The first player to win two rounds wins. 
Played by: Cohutta vs. Ryan, Jodi vs. Sophia
Weight, There's More: Players must transfer 1,000 pounds of sandbags across the Arena to the end of their ramp to reveal a puzzle. The first player to solve the puzzle, which involves sorting colored skulls by sliding them into position, wins.
Played by: Ayanna vs. Katie, Brad vs. Derrick K.
Switchback: Each player has three colored skulls placed on the boundary of the Arena that begin switched on. They must run across the Arena and flip the light switches off for their opponent's skulls, or switch their own skulls back on, while their opponent does the same. The first player to switch off all three of their opponent's skulls while also having at least of their skulls on wins.
Played by: Steve vs. Teck, Melinda vs. Tina
Pole Wrestle: Players begin at the center of the Arena with both hands on a metal pole. The first player to wrestle the pole out of their opponent's hands twice wins. 
Played by: Laterrian vs. Tyler
Like Clockwork: One team member begins in a glass case which has six possible mechanical gear combinations printed on the floor. They must identify the gear combination that would correctly function when spun and verbally communicate it to their partner, who recreates the combination by placing colored gears on a puzzle board. During the elimination, the glass case would slowly fill with sand making it more difficult to view the combinations as time progresses. The first team to assemble the correct gear combination wins.
Played by: Jasmine & Laterrian vs. Melinda & Nehemiah
Smash House: One team member begins in a furnished room and must use a sledgehammer to smash the furniture into pieces and fit them through a six-inch hole to the adjacent empty room where their partner is located. Their partner must then use a sledgehammer to smash the debris into smaller pieces and fit them through a three-inch hole and into a bucket. After ten minutes, the buckets are weighed. The team with the most weight in their bucket wins.
Played by: Brad & Jodi vs. Darrell & Janelle

Final Challenge
After the "Smash House" elimination, it was announced that the remaining four teams would immediately commence the Final Challenge.

Day One
Overnight Stage: Each team is provided with one hammock for the night. One team member may sleep on the hammock at a time while their partner must stand on a log during this time.

Day Two
Phase One: Teams race down a winding jungle path to the "Nucleus" area where they would find an empty board and instructions for three checkpoints located within the jungle. They must complete each checkpoint (in any order) to collect a mandala piece. After collecting all three mandala pieces, teams place them on the board to form a mandala. The first three teams to complete their mandala advance to Phase Two while the remaining team is eliminated.
Checkpoints
Decode: Teams are given a flashlight and must follow blue arrows through the jungle until they reach a dark cave.  They must search for and memorize multiple symbols and their corresponding numbers printed on the cave’s walls. They must then return to the Nucleus and decode the secret phrase "Redemption and Perseverance" on a decoding ring to receive their mandala piece. 
Memory: Teams follow red arrows through the jungle to a puzzle key with dozens of symbols printed on them. They must memorize the locations of each pair of symbols, return to the Nucleus and flip over covered squares on a memory board to reveal each pair to receive their mandala piece. If teams make a mistake, they must return to the puzzle key before they can continue.
Pole Puzzle: Teams must ride two bicycles, which are tethered together, to the end of a path to find 14 three-dimensional puzzle pieces. They must then return all 14 pieces to the Nucleus and solve the vertical puzzle to receive their mandala piece.
 Eliminated: Ayanna & Teck (4th place — Quit)

Phase Two: Teams must consume a plate of fish-eye tostadas, cricket-stuffed burritos and cockroach-topped nachos. Additionally, each team member must drink a glass of blood. Once complete, teams proceed to the end of a runway where they must solve several algebraic equations to find the numerical value of several symbols. Teams then use these values as the code to unlock their safe containing $500,000 worth of banknotes. The first team to open their safe and bring the money inside to a nearby plane are declared the winners of All Stars 2 and are awarded the $500,000 from their safe.
Winners: Jonna & MJ — $500,000 ($250,000 each)
 Runners-Up: Darrell & Janelle, Melinda & Nehemiah

Game summary

Episode progress

Competition
 The contestant won the Final Challenge
 The contestant did not win the Final Challenge
 The contestant won the challenge and was granted immunity from the Arena
 The contestant won the challenge, but was not granted immunity from the Arena
 The contestant was not selected for the Arena
 The contestant was saved from being nominated for the Arena by the Life Shield
 The contestant placed last in the daily challenge or was voted into the Arena, but did not have to compete
 The contestant was nominated by the winners, but was not voted to compete in the Arena
 The contestant won the elimination in the Arena
 The contestant was removed from the competition due to medical reasons
 The contestant was disqualified from the competition due to their partner being removed
 The contestant lost in the Arena and was eliminated
 The contestant withdrew from the competition

Voting progress

 Bold indicates the winning team casting a tiebreaking vote

Team selections

 Bold indicates team captains

Episodes

Notes

References

2021 American television seasons
2022 American television seasons
All Stars, The Challenge
Television shows set in Cancún
Television shows filmed in Mexico